The Marschnerstraße, named after the composer Heinrich Marschner (1795-1861), is a street founded in 1897, in the Munich district of Pasing and Obermenzing.

History 
Marschnerstraße, originally named Riemerschmidstraße, is alongside the Alte Allee, the second main connecting street in the Villenkolonie Pasing II, which was created to reflect the model of a garden city. The Marschnerstraße begins at the Alte Allee, where the Himmelfahrtskirche stands as a monumental construction, and leads to the Peter-Kreuder-Straße.

The Allee runs parallel to the Munich-Augsburg train route. In the first decade a sporadic construction of villas occurred there.

Historical buildings on Marschnerstraße

Literature 

 Dennis A. Chevalley, Timm Weski: Landeshauptstadt München – Südwest (= Bavarian State Office for Monument Protection [ed.]: Denkmäler in Bayern. Vol. I.2/2). Karl M. Lipp Verlag, Munich 2004, p. 430–431.

Streets in Munich
Buildings and structures in Munich
Pasing-Obermenzing